Miloš Đalac (Cyrillic: Милош Ђалац, born 17 October 1982) is a Montenegrin retired football striker who last played for Mladost Lješkopolje.

Club career
After starting his career with FK Crvena Stijena, he played with FK Mornar before signing in 2003 with FK Kom playing in the 2003–04 First League of Serbia and Montenegro. He will have a short spell with FK Dečić before moving in January 2006 to NK Čelik Zenica playing in the Premier League of Bosnia and Herzegovina. In January 2007 he returns to Montenegro signing with OFK Grbalj. He will also play with two more clubs in the Montenegrin First League, FK Zeta and FK Berane, before moving to Serbia in 2010 and signing with FK Novi Pazar playing in the Serbian First League, Serbian second tier. In 2012, he returned to Montenegro to play for Grbalj. After one season at Čelik Nikšić, he signed for Mladost Podgorica. In 2015 his contract with Mladost expired, and he joined Lovćen on a free transfer.

Honours
Mladost Podgorica
Montenegrin Cup: 2015

External links

1982 births
Living people
Footballers from Podgorica
Association football forwards
Montenegrin footballers
FK Crvena Stijena players
FK Mornar players
FK Kom players
FK Dečić players
NK Čelik Zenica players
OFK Grbalj players
FK Zeta players
FK Berane players
FK Novi Pazar players
FK Čelik Nikšić players
OFK Titograd players
FK Lovćen players
FK Mladost Velika Obarska players
Montenegrin First League players
Premier League of Bosnia and Herzegovina players
Serbian SuperLiga players
Serbian First League players
Montenegrin Second League players
Montenegrin expatriate footballers
Expatriate footballers in Bosnia and Herzegovina
Montenegrin expatriate sportspeople in Bosnia and Herzegovina
Expatriate footballers in Serbia
Montenegrin expatriate sportspeople in Serbia